Against All Odds is the second studio album by English hip hop group N-Dubz. It was released in Ireland on 13 November 2009 and was released on 16 November 2009 in the UK.

Background
Following the release of Uncle B (2008), Tulisa told the Daily Star: "We have just taken a quick break. We're having fun since our return to the studio, and the album is sounding good." She revealed that the group have adopted unusual work patterns while making the new record: "We normally work till 5am - I come alive at midnight, like a vampire." She added that the group had recorded a song called "Shoulda Put Something On", a track about teenage pregnancy, for the album. "It is about a young couple arguing whether to keep their unplanned baby. It's not something any of us have been through personally. But everyone knows someone who has. The three of us wrote down our different perspectives and we based the song around that. It's our favourite track on the album." The group were rumoured to be recording a song with Kylie Minogue for the album, after she expressed praise for their debut album Uncle B, however, Tulisa denied the rumours. The group announced that the album would be released on November 16, 2009, before revealing the album title. When covering for Semtex on BBC Radio 1Xtra, Fazer and Tulisa stated that their former manager, Dappy's father (Byron Contostavlos), wanted Against All Odds to be the title of their debut album, but after his death, they changed it to Uncle B in memory of him and so Against All Odds was the title for their second album. They also confirm this in the album booklet. The album includes six different collaborations, including an updated version of the Tinchy Stryder's single "Number 1". Stryder's first verse was kept, but new verses by Tulisa and Fazer were recorded. The album was mixed at The Chairworks in Castleford Yorkshire by Kelvin Avon. The album has sold over 200,000 copies.

Critical reception

The album had received mixed to positive reviews from critics. Entertainment.ie gave the album one star out of five. The review stated, "The problem is that their brand of music is such lowest-common-denominator stuff that it manages to offend even those that it's aimed at through its sheer awfulness. With a debut album ('Uncle B') that went platinum in less than a year, all the trio needed to do was write a quick follow-up to cash in on their popularity, and they’ve done exactly that. There's little creativity involved in these grimy tunes, smothered in layers of synthesized vocals and rapid-fire raps". The Guardian gave it a mainly positive review, although they felt the album was "hardly exploding with originality, and the various references to Facebook, their beef with Swag Blanket and how many records they've sold do grate". It finished by saying that "N-Dubz are bound to be inescapable in 2010 – most probably because they will be being blasted out of a mobile phone on the bus". Digital Spy gave the album a solid 4/5 review, stating "The Camden crew's impressive second album positions them at the forefront of British pop music".

Track listing

Album booklet
The group confirmed in an interview that the booklet will include several features along with the album If a buyer logs on the "3D" page of the N-Dubz website and faces the back of the album booklet to their webcam, the trio will appear standing on the booklet and perform "I Need You". The group call the booklet a "N-Dubz magazine", which includes the following:
 Introduction
 N-Dubz Glossary
 Exclusive Interviews
 Tour Must Haves
 We Love Our Adidas
 N-Dubz Look
 Behind The Scenes ("I Need You" and "Playing With Fire")
 Thank You's
 Family Tree
 Private Picture Gallery
 Credits
 Lyrics

Personnel
Credits for Against All Odds adapted from AllMusic.

 Tim Aluo – Guitar
 Amir Amor – Additional Production, Engineer, Vocal Engineer
 Kelvin "Afreex" Avon – Engineer, Mixing
 Gary Barlow – Composer
 Jason Brooks – Bass
 Rich Castillo – A&R, Management
 Chipmunk – Composer
 Dino Contostavlos – Composer, Producer
 Tula Contostavlos – Composer
 Dean Coulson – Assistant
 Kwasi Danquah – Composer
 Junior Edwards – Composer, Producer
 Engine – Artwork – Design

 Anthony Evolko – Composer
 Aaron "Breakbeat" Fagan – Drums
 Tom Fuller – Bass Engineer, Drum Engineering, Engineer, Mixing, Piano, Vocal Engineer
 Simon Gogerly – Mixing
 Evangelis Klemis – Composer, Producer
 Ian McManus – Photography
 Mr. Hudson – Composer
 James Mottershead – Assistant Engineer, Mixing Assistant
 Ross 'Dights' Parkin – Engineer
 Richard Rawson – Composer, Producer
 Harry Rutherford – Editing, Engineer, Guitar Engineer, Vocal Engineer
 Jonathan Shalit – Management
 Frasier T. Smith – Composer, Producer
 Adam Swales – Drums

Charts

Weekly charts

Year-end charts

Certifications

References

N-Dubz albums
2009 albums